The Buddhism Palm Strikes Back is a Hong Kong wuxia comedy television series based on Wong Yuk-long's manhua series Buddha's Palm. The series was first broadcast on TVB Jade in Hong Kong in 1993.

Plot 
The legendary Buddha's Palm is the most powerful skill in the kong-woo (martial artists' community) that a fighter can learn. A long time ago, Lung Kim-fei used the skill to defeat Tin Cam-kiuk, and had since retired from the kong-woo. Lung laid down a family rule, forbidding his descendants from learning the skill, and hid the Buddha's Palm manual, in order to prevent them from misusing it.

70 years later, a mysterious red-haired martial artist known as "For-wun Tse-san" (literally: Fire Cloud Evil Deity) appears and goes on a rampage to kill several people before challenging the five major martial arts schools to a fight. The five schools misbelieve that Lung Kim-sang, a descendant of Lung Kim-fei, is responsible for the killings and attack him. In fact, Lung Kim-sang does not know martial arts and relies on his wit and intelligence to survive. When For-wun Tse-san learns that Lung Kim-sang is a descendant of Lung Kim-fei, he starts harassing Lung Kim-sang to force him to hand over the Buddha's Palm manual.

Lung Kim-sang meets Kung-suen Ling-fung, a maiden from the Omei School, and she falls in love with him and follows him on his adventures. At one point, Kung-suen gives up her virginity to save Lung's life after he is poisoned by For-wun Tse-san. Lung loses his memory after regaining consciousness and meets Fung Ching-ching and falls in love with her. However, when he remembers everything, he finds himself in a complicated love triangle.

Throughout his adventures, Lung Kim-sang learns martial arts from extraordinary people, such as Tung-to Cheung-lei. Eventually, he finds the Buddha's Palm manual in the old Lung family residence and masters the skill, becoming an invincible fighter. Lung defeats For-wun Tse-san, putting an end to the latter's evil plan. However, he is unaware that Tin Heung, a descendant of Tin Cam-kiuk, has been secretly plotting to kill him to avenge her ancestor. Lung and Tin have a final showdown and Lung emerges victorious eventually, restoring peace and becoming a respected hero in the kong-woo.

Cast
 Note: Some of the characters' names are in Cantonese romanisation.

 Eddie Kwan as Lung Kim-sang
 Elvina Kong as Kung-suen Ling-fung
 Johnny Ngan as Tong-to Cheung-lei
 Gordon Liu as For-wun Tse-san / Ngo Chin-san
 Catherine Hung as Fung Ching-ching / Fung Piu-piu
 Ada Choi as Tin-heung
 Law Lan as Tin-yan
 Lee Lung-kei as Tin-chi
 Kwan Ching as Tin family housekeeper
 Yeung Tak-si as Shek Kan-chun
 Jimmy Au as Hau Yat-fei
 Law Lok-lam (guest star) as Lung Kim-fei
 Lo Mang (guest star) as Tin Cam-kiuk
 Fung So-bor as Granny
 Wong Wai-tung as Master Yat-dang
 Law Kwok-hung as Antique shop boss
 Lee Hin-ming as Ah-fu
 Wong Chung-hong as Ah-pao
 Wong Wai-tak as Ah-ma
 Chun Hung as Mou Si-ting
 Yu Fung as Granny Kwai / Kau Yuk-kuen
 Ho Bik-kin as Fung Mun-lau
 Yu Ming as Ka-La Old Dad
 Wong Tak-ban as Mang-kor
 Kiu Hung as Great Master Yat-yau
 Wong Yat-fei as Taoist Sam-san
 Sing Yan as Old Master Ng-hang
 Lee Ka-ting as Swordsman Tsat-sing
 Soh Hang-suen as Abbess Kau-kuet
 Henry Lee as Si-hung Kin-kuan
 Lee Hoi-sang as Hong-lung
 Chan Kwan-yung as Fuk-fu
 Lau Kwai-fong as Abbess Bat-kuet
 Liu Lai-lai as Abbess Tsat-kuet
 Mak Ho-wai as Cheung Sam / Ah-seung
 Wong Tin-chak as Lei Say / Ah-ha
 Mak Tsi-wan as Elder Chung
 Fong Kit as Elder Chuk
 Yu Tin-wai as Elder Mui

|align="center" colspan="4"|Before:The Yang's Women Warriors - June 11
|align="center" colspan="4"|TVB Jade Second line series 1993The Buddhism Palm Strikes BackJune 14 - July 9
|align="center" colspan="4"|Next:To Chord the VictoryJuly 12 -

1993 Hong Kong television series debuts
1993 Hong Kong television series endings
TVB dramas
Hong Kong wuxia television series
Cantonese-language television shows